This is a list of African-American newspapers that have been published in the state of Nebraska.

Most African American publishing has been concentrated in the city of Omaha, which was home to about half of the state's African-American population in the 19th century, and 70-80% in the 20th century. Some have also been published in Lincoln, home to a much smaller African American community.

The state's first known African-American newspaper was the short-lived Western Post of Hastings, founded in 1876. The first commercially successful newspapers were established in the 1890s. By far the most successful and longest-lived of Nebraska's African-American newspapers has been the Omaha Star, which was founded in 1938 and continues in operation today.

Newspapers

See also
African Americans in Omaha, Nebraska
List of African-American newspapers and media outlets
List of African-American newspapers in Colorado
List of African-American newspapers in Iowa
List of African-American newspapers in Kansas
List of African-American newspapers in Missouri
List of newspapers in Nebraska

Works cited

References

Elsewhere online
"A history of African American newspapers in North Omaha," by Adam Fletcher Sasse for NorthOmahaHistory.com.

Newspapers
Nebraska
African-American
African-American newspapers